Isenburg-Braunsberg was the name of a state of the Holy Roman Empire, based around Braunsberg in modern Rhineland-Palatinate, Germany. It was created as a partition of Isenburg-Isenburg in 1199 (1210). In 1338 Isenburg-Braunsberg became an Imperial County. It slowly acquired territories of the County of Wied, being renamed to Isenburg-Wied in 1388.

Counts of Isenburg-Braunsberg

Counties of the Holy Roman Empire
House of Isenburg